Liri Ballabani Stadium (a.k.a. Burreli Stadium) is a multi-purpose stadium in Burrel, Albania. The stadium is the home ground of KS Burreli and has a capacity of 3,000.

References

Football venues in Albania
Multi-purpose stadiums in Albania
Buildings and structures in Mat (municipality)